Bio 360 Life Sciences Park is a Biotechnology and Life Sciences park in the city of Thiruvananthapuram, Kerala, India. An additional  of land is being undertaken by the government of Kerala as the Phase 2 development of the park.

The park focuses on incubation, R&D and manufacturing in the fields of life sciences, biotechnology, nanotechnology. bioinformatics, biomedical devices and pharmaceuticals.

Institutions
Bio 360 Life Sciences Park houses the Bioscience Research and Training Centre (BRTC) of the Kerala Veterinary and Animal Sciences University (KVASU). BRTC do research into disease prevention and immune systems in animals. KVASU is also planning to start an Animal Research Facility as part of the BRTC. The Sree Chitra Tirunal Institute for Medical Sciences and Technology (SCTIMST) is planning to  establish a bio-medical equipment unit for research and production of bio-medical equipment.

Institute of Advanced Virology, Kerala
The Institute of Advanced Virology, Kerala established by the Kerala Biotechnology Commission (KBC) is a  project hosted in the park. The Institute will offer academic discipline, including PG diploma and Ph.D. in virology.
The Virology Institute includes high-end research facilities to study viruses and viral infections. The institute will also have 9 laboratories with Biosafety Level 3 and Biosafety level 2 facilities. The bio safety level 3 (BSL-3) laboratory will be upgraded to Biosafety level 4 subsequently. The institute will have facilities for the development of novel antiviral drugs, vaccines and molecular diagnostic tools. The institute would also house a unit of the Global Virus Network.

See also
Technopark, Trivandrum
Technocity, Thiruvananthapuram

References

External links
Bio 360 official website
KSIDC official website

Organisations based in Thiruvananthapuram
Science and technology in Thiruvananthapuram
2013 establishments in Kerala